As of 2021,there are 31 regions of Tanzania which are divided into 184 districts (Swahili: wilaya).

In 2016, Songwe Region was created from the western part of Mbeya Region.

The districts are each administered by a district council. Cities are separately administered by their own councils, and while administratively within a region, are not considered to be located within a district. The districts are listed below, by unofficial area then region:

Ten most populated districts 

 Kinondoni Municipal Council, Dar es Salaam Region (1,775,049 inhabitants)
 Temeke Municipal Council, Dar es Salaam Region (1,368,881 inhabitants)
 Ilala Municipal Council, Dar es Salaam Region (1,220,611 inhabitants)
 Geita District Council, Geita Region (807,619 inhabitants)
 Sengerema District Council, Mwanza Region (663,034 inhabitants)
 Muleba District Council, Kagera Region (540,310 inhabitants)
 Kahama District Council, Shinyanga Region (523,802 inhabitants)
 Nzega District Council, Tabora Region (502,252 inhabitants)
 Lushoto District Council, Tanga Region (492,441 inhabitants)
 Moshi District Council, Kilimanjaro Region (466,737 inhabitants)

Central

Dodoma Region

Singida Region

Tabora Region

Coast

Dar es Salaam Region

Lindi Region

Morogoro Region

Mtwara Region

Pwani Region

Lake

Kagera Region

Kigoma Region

Geita Region

Mara Region

Mwanza Region

Shinyanga Region

Simiyu Region

North

Arusha Region

Kilimanjaro Region

Manyara Region

Tanga Region

South

Iringa Region

Katavi Region

Mbeya Region

Njombe Region

Rukwa Region

Ruvuma Region

Songwe Region

Zanzibar

Mjini Magharibi Region

Zanzibar North Region

Unguja South Region

Pemba North Region

Pemba South Region

See also
 Regions of Tanzania

References

External links
 The official Map of Tanzania with New Regions and Districts, Tanzania Ministry of Lands, Housing & Human Settlements Development, 21 September 2012

 
Subdivisions of Tanzania
Tanzania, Districts
Tanzania 2
Districts, Tanzania